Réveillon may refer to:

  Réveillon, a long dinner, and possibly party, held on the evenings preceding Christmas Day and New Year's Day, in Brazil, in Portugal, in France and some other French-speaking countries

Réveillon is the name of two communes in France:
 Réveillon, Marne, in the Marne département
 Réveillon, Orne, in the Orne département

Réveillon is the name of two rivers in France:
 Réveillon (Yerres), tributary of the Yerres, crossing the Seine-et-Marne and the Val-de-Marne departments
 Réveillon (Epte), tributary of the Epte, crossing the Oise and the Eure departments

Réveillon is a surname:
 Jean-Baptiste Réveillon
 Réveillon riots

Réveillon is also:
 Le Réveillon, a play by Henri Meilhac and Ludovic Halévy which became the basis for Die Fledermaus